Azure Ryder, is an Australian musician, singer, songwriter from Sydney, Australia but is currently based in London. She released her debut EP, Running With The Wolves, on 27 March 2020. Azure Covered Dua Lipa's song "Don't Start Now" for Triple J's Like a Version Ryder's third EP, Ladder to the Moon was released on 29 October 2021

Speaking on the Ladder to the Moon Ryder said "This EP is the journey I took through discovering how to stand strongly in who I am, unapologetic about my voice, my dreams and the depth of how I love. When you choose to surrender to love whether it be for yourself or another, these landscapes that once held limitations become wide, commanding and wild like a woman."

Early life
After finishing high school, Ryder went traveling through America and decided to do a music course at Berklee College of Music in Boston.

Discography

Extended plays

Singles

References

1996 births
21st-century Australian singers
Australian musicians
Living people
Musicians from Sydney